José Domingo de Obaldía Gallegos (30 January 1845 – 1 March 1910) was President of Panama from October 1, 1908 to March 1, 1910. 

Jose Domingo de Obaldía Gallegos was the second President of the Republic of Panama from 1908 to 1910 and the first president elected by popular vote after the separation of Panama from Colombia.

Son of José de Obaldía and Ana Maria Gallegos. Born in David, Chiriqui on January 30, 1845. He died before finishing his term as President of the Republic of Panama on March 1, 1910.  Known as a strategist and gentleman of politics, was the last governor of the department of the Isthmus of Panama in 1903. 

During the first government of the Republic, he was elected as the second presidential designate by the National Assembly for the term 1904-1906, and as the first presidential designate for the term 1906-1908.

When José Domingo de Obaldía assumed the presidency since 1908, he began a policy of protecting the dignity and respect for the interests of the Panamanian nation in relations between Panama and the United States, also reinforcing the country's security from promulgation of Decree No. 18 of January 26, 1909, for the establishment of the  National Secret Police. In addition, he realized a project of the correctional houses of Colon and Panama, and also created the District of Santa Maria. In the educational field, he executed the construction project of the National Institute of Panama among others.

References
• Mellander, Gustavo A., Mellander, Nelly, Charles Edward Magoon: The Panama Years. Río Piedras, Puerto Rico: Editorial Plaza Mayor. ISBN 1-56328-155-4. OCLC 42970390. (1999)

• Mellander, Gustavo A., The United States in Panamanian Politics: The Intriguing Formative Years." Danville, Ill.: Interstate Publishers. OCLC 138568. (1971)

1845 births
1910 deaths
People from David District
National Liberal Party (Panama) politicians
Presidents of Panama
Vice presidents of Panama
Jose Domingo